Uprising is the twelfth studio album by Bob Marley and the Wailers released in 1980. Lead vocalist Bob Marley died the following year, and Uprising was the final studio album released during his lifetime. The album is one of Marley's most directly religious, with nearly every song referencing his Rastafarian beliefs, culminating in the acoustic recording of "Redemption Song".

Uprising peaked at number 41 on the US Billboard Black Albums chart, and number 45 on the Pop Albums chart. "Could You Be Loved" was number six and number 56 respectively on the Club Play Singles and Black Singles charts. The album fared better in the UK where it was a top ten hit along with the single "Could You Be Loved" which reached number five in the UK singles charts.

Track listing

Original album (1980)

The Definitive Remastered edition (2001)

Personnel

Musicians
Bob Marley – lead vocal, rhythm guitar, acoustic guitar
Aston "Family Man" Barrett – bass, piano, guitar, percussion
Carlton Barrett – drums, percussion
Carlton "Santa" Davis – drums
Tyrone Downie – keyboards, backing vocal
Alvin Patterson – percussion
Junior Marvin – lead guitar, backing vocal
Earl Lindo – keyboards
Al Anderson – lead guitar
I Threes (Rita Marley, Marcia Griffiths and Judy Mowatt) – backing vocals

Production
Bob Marley and the Wailers – Producers
Chris Blackwell – Executive producer
Errol Brown – engineer, mixing engineer
the Wailers and Michael Rees – mixed
Chiao Ng – assistant engineer
Ted Jensen – mastering engineer
Neville Garrick – art direction
Adrian Boot – photo

Charts

Weekly charts

Year-end charts

Certifications

References

Bob Marley and the Wailers albums
Tuff Gong albums
1980 albums
Albums produced by Chris Blackwell
Island Records albums